Children's Hall Station is a station of the Daegu Metro Line 3 in Hwanggeum-dong, Suseong District, Daegu, South Korea.

External links
 
 

Daegu Metro stations
Suseong District
Daegu Metro Line 3
Railway stations opened in 2015
2015 establishments in South Korea